Amaranthus blitum, commonly called purple amaranth or Guernsey pigweed, is an annual plant species in the economically important plant family Amaranthaceae.

Description
Amaranthus blitum is an erect or semi-prostrate annual plant. They are simple, roughly triangular in shape and have entire margins. The inflorescence is a spike with the tiny male and female flowers clustered together. The fruits are small globular capsules containing disc-shaped seeds.

Distribution and habitat
Native to the Mediterranean region, it is naturalized in other parts of the world, including much of eastern North America, much of tropical Africa, Western Europe and Japan. In Britain it was first recorded in the wild in 1771 when it appeared in Essex. It occurred more frequently in scattered locations in southern England in the 19th century but has since decreased. It is established in Guernsey and elsewhere as a casual plant, springing up on waste ground, rubbish tips and cultivated areas, probably from wool waste, coconut fibre or birdseed.

Uses
Although not cultivated, this plant is gathered from the wild and eaten in many parts of the world. 
Similarly, it is also picked as young shoots in Lebanon and cooked in olive oil, onion, chilli, and burghul, seasoned with salt and drizzled with lemon juice before eating with pita bread. It is considered a side dish and particularly popular in the north of Lebanon.

Related plants

The closely related Amaranthus viridis, the slender amaranth or green amaranth, is also widely eaten.

References

External links

 PROTAbase on Amaranthus blitum
 

blitum
Plants described in 1753
Taxa named by Carl Linnaeus
Leaf vegetables